The Puthia Temple Complex consists of a cluster of notable old Hindu temples in Puthia Upazila, Rajshahi District, Bangladesh. Located 23 km to the east of Rajshahi city, it has the largest number of historic temples in Bangladesh. The temples were built by Hindu Zamindars Rajas of the Puthia Raj family who were noted philanthropists of Rajshahi. The temples have been built in terracotta in a variety of styles combining the typical Jor-bangla architecture with other influences. The Rajbari or Palace of the Raja of Puthia and the Dol Mancha are part of the complex. The temples are laid out around a lake with a sprawling lawn.

The Puthia Raj family was established by a holy man named Bhatsacharya, who lived in the 16th century. Raja Man Singh, governor of the Mughal emperor Akbar, confiscated the Jagir of the refractory pathan jagirdar of Rajshahi named Lashker Khan and bestowed the Zamindary on the saintly Bhatsacharya for his learning, but he declined. However, his son Pitambar was granted the Lashkarpur estate permanently. On his death, his son Nilambar received the title of Raja from Emperor Jahangir. The Puthia Royal Family estate was the second largest zamindary and the wealthiest in British Bengal. After India's partition, the then Pakistani government abolished the zamindary system and confiscated all Hindu properties. The Royal Family migrated to India shortly afterwards.

Pancha Ratna Govinda Temple 
This grand temple of Puthia, the Govinda Temple was erected in mid-nineteenth century by the queen of Puthia. The temple is dedicated to Lord Krishna, as the Puthia royal family were converted to Vaishnavism by Radhamohana Thakura. The temple has exquisite terracotta ornamentation depicting the divine romance between Krishna and Radha. The temple's survival is threatened by the newly established college nearby and the lack of conservation efforts.the temple was erected in between 1823 and 1895.

Bhubaneshwar Shiva Temple 

The Bhubaneshwar Shiva Temple is the largest Shiva temple in Bangladesh. Built in 1823 by Rani Bhubonmoyee Devi, the widow of Raja Jagat Narayan Roy, it overlooks the Shiv Sagar lake. This ornate temple is an imposing and excellent example of the five spire style (Pancha Ratna) temple architecture common in northern India. The corridors have a touch of Jaipuri architecture and in the sanctuary, lies a very large black basalt Shiva Linga, the largest in the country. It is decorated with stone carvings and sculptural works, which were disfigured during the Bangladesh Liberation War in 1971. The invading Pakistani army attempted to displace and break the Shiva Linga, but were unable to move it from its position. The temple is now a protected monument.

Jagannath Temple 
The Jagannath Temple (also known as the Roth Temple) is dedicated to the Hindu God Jagannath, a form of Krishna. It is a fine example of Bengali architecture, having intricate embellishments and terracotta reliefs, it measures 5m by 5m.

Chota Anhik Mandir 
Chota Anhik Mandir is a small Hindu temple in the Puthia Temple Complex. It is located near the Pancharatna Govinda Temple.

Chauchala Chhota Govinda Mandir 
Chauchala Chhota Govinda Mandir is a Hindu temple in the Puthia complex. The temple is believed to date to the 1790s-1800s period. The southern frontage is extensively decorated with terracotta plaques, which depict ten incarnations Avatars of Vishnu, Lankakanda a chapter in the epic Ramayana legend, Radha-Krishna epic stories, flower designs and geometric art and scenes of the civic life of the period.

Bara Anhik Mandir 
Bara Anhik Mandir (Big Anhik Temple) is a Hindu temple of the Puthia Temple Complex. It stands next to Chauchala Chhota Govinda Mandir on the west side of the complex and faces east. Architecturally it is exceptional for Bangladesh, the only other of known existence of this type being Rajaram Mandir in Faridpur District. It was built by the Rajas of Puthia.

Gallery

References 

 Rajshahi Jela Somity : An introduction to Rajshahi, the heartland of Varendra by Dr.NAZIMUDDIN AHMED

External links 

 Temples of Puthia

 
Hindu temples in Rajshahi Division
Rajshahi District
Archaeological sites in Rajshahi District